Royal Air Force Kings Cliffe or more simply RAF Kings Cliffe is a former Royal Air Force satellite station located near Kings Cliffe, Northamptonshire,  west of Peterborough in Cambridgeshire.  The airfield was built with hard-surfaced runways and a perimeter track, these were extended early in 1943.

History

RAF use - early wartime
Construction work on the airfield commenced in 1940. The base opened in October 1941 as a satellite to RAF Wittering. No. 133 Fighter Squadron moved in with Spitfire Vb's on 29 September 1941; this unit was the third "Eagle Squadron" formed in RAF Fighter Command from American volunteers. 266 (Rhodesian) Squadron arrived in October 1941 followed in due course by No. 485 (New Zealand) Squadron in July 1942 and later No. 93 Squadron in September 1942. The RAF presence ceased in August 1943. The airfield was extended during 1943.

The following units were here at some point:

USAAF use
Kings Cliffe was assigned USAAF designation Station 367.  It was the most northerly and furthest west of all Eighth Air Force fighter stations.  It was in the 1st Air Division heavy bomber base area and more than fifty miles west of any other fighter airfield.  In spite of the reduced range of escort flights operating from such a westerly airfield, there does not appear to have been any attempt to move the Group to another site nearer the coast.

347th Fighter Squadron
Kings Cliffe received its first American units in December 1942 when a few Bell P-39 Airacobras of the 347th Fighter Squadron of the 350th Fighter Group located at RAF Duxford were briefly located there.

56th Fighter Group
In January 1943 the 56th Fighter Group of the United States Army Air Forces's Eighth Air Force arrived at Kings Cliffe from Bridgeport AAF Connecticut with the 347th FS returning to Duxford.  The group was under the command of 67th Fighter Wing of the VIII Fighter Command.

The group consisted of the following squadrons:
 61st Fighter Squadron (HV)
 62d Fighter Squadron (LM)
 63d Fighter Squadron (UN)

The 56th Fighter group spent its time at Kings Cliffe learning RAF fighter control procedures and training for combat with new Republic P-47 Thunderbolts and did not fly any operational missions. In April 1943, the group was transferred to the 65th Fighter Wing and moved to RAF Horsham St Faith.

20th Fighter Group
On 26 August 1943, the 20th Fighter Group arrived from March AAF California.  The group was under the command of the 67th Fighter Wing of the VIII Fighter Command.  Aircraft of the 20th were identified by a black/white stripes along their cowlings and tails.

The group consisted of the following squadrons:
 55th Fighter Squadron (KI)
 77th Fighter Squadron (LC)
 79th Fighter Squadron (MC)

At first. one squadron, the 55th. was billeted at RAF Wittering because of the shortage of accommodation at Kings Cliffe, later moving to the base when additional barracks had been built.  The 20th FG entered combat with Lockheed P-38 Lightnings late in December 1943 and for several months was engaged primarily in escorting heavy and medium bombers to targets on the Continent.  The group frequently strafed targets of opportunity while on escort missions.

The group retained escort as its primary function until the end of the war, but in March 1944 began to fly fighter-bomber missions, which became almost as frequent as escort operations. The squadrons strafed and dive-bombed airfields, trains, vehicles, barges, tugs, bridges, flak positions, gun emplacements, barracks, radio stations, and other targets in France, Belgium, and Germany.

The 20th became known as the "Loco Group" because of its numerous and successful attacks on locomotives. Received a Distinguished Unit Citation for its performance on 8 April 1944 when the group struck airfields in central Germany and then, after breaking up an attack by enemy interceptors, proceeded to hit railroad equipment, oil facilities, power plants, factories, and other targets.

Aircraft from the 20th flew patrols over the English Channel during the invasion of Normandy in June 1944, and supported the invasion force later that month by escorting bombers that struck interdictory targets in France, Belgium, and the Netherlands, and by attacking troops, transportation targets, and airfields.

The 20th FG converted to North American P-51 Mustangs in July 1944 and continued to fly escort and fighter-bomber missions as the enemy retreated across France to the Siegfried Line. The group participated in the airborne attack on the Netherlands in September 1944, and escorted bombers to Germany and struck rail lines, trains, vehicles, barges, power stations, and other targets in and beyond the Siegfried Line during the period October–December 1944.

The unit took part in the Battle of the Bulge by escorting bombers to the battle area. Flew patrols to support the airborne attack across the Rhine in March 1945, and carried out escort and fighter-bomber missions as enemy resistance collapsed in April.

The 20th Fighter Group returned to Camp Kilmer, New Jersey and was inactivated on 18 December 1945.

Glenn Miller

Glenn Miller played his last airfield band concert in the big T2 hangar at Kings Cliffe. This final concert took place on Tuesday 3 October 1944 as it was getting too cold to play in unheated hangars. A memorial was placed on a Callendar Hamilton hangar base.

Legacy

On 29 July 1946 the 20th was reactivated Biggs Field, Texas then to Shaw AFB, South Carolina in October 1946 (in August 1947 it became part of the new 20th Fighter Wing), then Langley AFB, Virginia in November 1951, in June 1952 the 20th Fighter-Bomber Wing returned to RAF Wethersfield then in 1970 to RAF Upper Heyford as part of the United States Air Force in Europe.  The unit remained in the UK until 1993 when it returned to Shaw Air Force Base South Carolina as part of the drawdown of US forces in Europe after the end of the Cold War.

Royal Air Force use post war

After the war, the field was used by the RAF for armament storage until being sold and returned to agriculture in January 1959.

Current use

Kings Cliffe airfield has largely returned to agriculture, however the outlines and concreted areas of the runways are readily identifiable. The perimeter track has been reduced to a single-track agricultural road with the hardstandings removed for hardcore.  The technical site and hangars have been razed but an abandoned control tower still exists as does an original Blister hangar re-erected on a farm just north of the airfield. Dispersed buildings in Bedford Purlieus included the combined gymnasium/cinema/chapel which still survives on the former airfield's Communal Site.

A memorial to the airfield and the squadrons operating there was unveiled by the Duke of Gloucester in 1983.

See also

List of former Royal Air Force stations

References

Citations

Bibliography

 Freeman, Roger A. (1978) Airfields of the Eighth: Then and Now. After the Battle 
 Freeman, Roger A. (1991) The Mighty Eighth The Colour Record. Cassell & Co. 
 Maurer, Maurer (1983). Air Force Combat Units Of World War II. Maxwell AFB, Alabama: Office of Air Force History. .
 www.controltowers.co.uk Kings Cliffe
 mighty8thaf.preller.us Kings Cliffe
 56th Fighter Group on www.littlefriends.co.uk
 20th Fighter Group on www.littlefriends.co.uk
 USAAS-USAAC-USAAF-USAF Aircraft Serial Numbers--1908 to present

External links

 20th Fighter Group Project

Airfields of the VIII Fighter Command in the United Kingdom
Royal Air Force stations in Northamptonshire